SpiceJet is an Indian budget airline headquartered in Gurgaon, Haryana. It is the second largest airline in India by number of domestic passengers carried, with a market share of 13.6% as of March 2019. The airline operates 630 daily flights to 64 destinations, including 54 Indian and 15 international destinations from its bases at Delhi and Hyderabad.

Established as air taxi provider ModiLuft in 1994, the company was acquired by Indian entrepreneur Ajay Singh in 2004 and renamed to SpiceJet. The airline operated its first flight in May 2005. Indian media baron Kalanidhi Maran acquired a controlling stake in SpiceJet in June 2010 through Sun Group which was sold back to Ajay Singh in January 2015. The airline operates a fleet of Boeing 737 and Bombardier Dash 8 aircraft.

History

1984–1996: ModiLuft era

The origins of SpiceJet can be tracked back to March 1984 when the company was established by Indian industrialist S. K. Modi to provide private air taxi services. On 17 February 1993, the company was named as MG Express and entered into technical partnership with the German flag carrier Lufthansa. The airline provided passenger and cargo services under the name of Modiluft before ceasing operations in 1996.

2005–2013: inception and expansion
In 2004, the company was acquired by Ajay Singh and the airline planned to restart operations as SpiceJet following the low-cost model. SpiceJet leased two Boeing 737-800 aircraft in 2005 and planned to order 10 new aircraft for expansion. SpiceJet opened bookings on 18 May 2005 and the first flight was operated between Delhi and Mumbai on 24 May 2005. By July 2008, it was India's third-largest low-cost carrier in terms of market share after Air Deccan and IndiGo. Indian media baron Kalanidhi Maran acquired 37.7% stake in SpiceJet in June 2010 through Sun Group. The airline ordered 30 Boeing 737-8 aircraft worth  July 2010 and a further 15 Bombardier Q4 Dash short-haul aircraft worth  in December 2010.

In 2012, SpiceJet suffered a loss of over  owing to increase in global crude prices. On 9 January 2012, the Directorate General of Civil Aviation, reported that several airlines in India, including SpiceJet, have not maintained crucial data for the flight operations quality assurance. The Bombay Stock Exchange announced that ever since June 2011, SpiceJet had been suffering losses. In 2012, Kalanidhi Maran increased his stake in the airline by investing  in the airline. The airline returned to profits at the end of the same year.  SpiceJet entered into an inter airline pact with Tigerair on 16 December 2013 which was scrapped in January 2015.

2014–2019: downturn and recovery
In January 2015, the Sun Group sold its entire shareholding and transferred control to Ajay Singh.

In late September 2017, the airline announced that it had placed a firm order for 25 Q400 turboprop aircraft.

In 2019, following the grounding of Jet Airways, Spicejet took over nearly 30 aircraft that were grounded by the former.

2020–present: pandemic 
SpiceExpress—the logistics arm of SpiceJet airline—has helped to keep the company afloat during the pandemic amid drastic drop in passenger business. In May 2021, the airline earned ₹200 crore from freight operations and commands a 5 per cent market share in India's outbound cargo business.

In July 2021, SpiceJet reported net losses shrunk to US$34.6 million during the fiscal quarter ended 31 March 2021, as revenue fell by 28% annually to $294.8 million. The airline plans to raise funds to the tune of $337.2 million to ensure its long term sustainability.

In May 2022, Directorate General of Civil Aviation started a safety investigation into SpiceJet's aircraft following a series of incidents involving malfunctioning plane equipment, including an incident where a flight from Mumbai to Durgapur experienced severe turbulence that injured 12 passengers and 3 crew members.

In July 2022, the Directorate General of Civil Aviation has imposed restrictions on SpiceJet flights following reports of continuous technical glitches. For eight weeks, the DGCA has directed that only 50% of the existing flight services should be allowed to fly. The proposal also states that there will be strict monitoring by DGCA during this period.

Corporate affairs

Ownership and structure 
SpiceJet Limited is publicly traded under NSE: SPICEJET, with a market capitalization of about ₹2,214.28 Cr as of 1 April 2020.

On 30 March 2020, HDFC Mutual Fund bought 3.4 crore shares of SpiceJet from the open market constituting 5.45% stake.

Headquarters 
SpiceJet is headquartered in Gurgaon, India. Ajay Singh serves as the managing director of the airline since January 2015. The airline's logo consists of 15 dots arranged in three rows of five each in the order of their reducing sizes on a red background. In June 2015, the airline unveiled its current logo with a new tagline Red. Hot. Spicy. SpiceJet names all its aircraft with the name of an Indian spice.

Destinations

As of November 2019, SpiceJet operated 630 flights daily to 52 Indian and 12 international destinations. It operates hubs at Delhi and Hyderabad, which is the primary base for its fleet of Bombardier Q400 aircraft. After completing five years of flying, SpiceJet was allowed to commence international flights by Directorate General of Civil Aviation on 7 September 2010. SpiceJet launched flights from Delhi to Kathmandu and Chennai to Colombo and the first international flight took off on 7 October 2010 from Delhi.

Codeshare agreements

SpiceJet codeshares with the following airline:

 Emirates
 Gulf Air

Fleet

As of March 2023,  SpiceJet operates the following aircraft:

New orders
SpiceJet placed its first firm order for 20 Next-Generation Boeing 737-800s in March 2005, with deliveries scheduled up to 2010. In November 2010, the airline ordered 30 Boeing 737-800s. On 9 December 2010, Bombardier Aerospace announced that SpiceJet had placed a firm order for fifteen Q400 NextGen turboprop airliners with options for another fifteen. SpiceJet used its fleet of Q400s for short-haul operations.

In March 2014, the airline signed a  deal with Boeing for the procurement of 42 737 MAX 8 aircraft. In 2015, SpiceJet was in talks with both Boeing and Airbus for a possible order of more than 100 single aisle aircraft, either Airbus A320neo or the Boeing 737 MAX with the same being confirmed by managing director, Ajay Singh, in a conference in Dubai.

In January 2017, the airline placed a firm order for 100 737 MAX 8 aircraft, and revealed itself as the airline behind the 13 MAX 8 aircraft previously attributed to an unidentified customer, taking its total order to 155 MAX 8 aircraft with purchase rights for 50 additional MAX 8 and wide-body aircraft. The budget carrier plans to grow its operational fleet to 200 airplanes by the end of the decade and expand regionally with the new 737 MAX family of airplanes.

In June 2017, the airline signed a letter of intent with Bombardier at the 2017 Paris Air Show, to purchase up to 50 Q400 aircraft, catering to growth in passenger traffic arising from its participation in the Indian government's UDAN regional connectivity scheme.

It is announced to induct 16 Boeing 737-800 NG in response to fulfil demands in local and international expansion. It was ordered due to the fleet of 737 MAX being currently banned and the downfall of Jet Airways.
Due to the closure of all Jet Airways flights they have place orders for 6 additional Boeing 737-800 NG and 5 more Bombardier Q-400 in Dry Lease to cover the shortage in the Indian aviation industry.

Historic fleet
Over the years, SpiceJet operated the following aircraft:
Airbus A319-100 Leased from BH Air
Airbus A320-200 Leased from BH Air
Airbus A330-900 Leased from Hifly.
Airbus A340-300 Leased from Hifly

Services

SpiceJet has moved away from the typical low-cost carrier service model of economy class-only seating. The airline offers premium services under the name SpiceMax, whereby passengers can obtain additional benefits including pre-assigned seats with extra legroom; meals on board; priority check-in and boarding; and priority baggage handling; at a higher fare. Otherwise SpiceJet does not provide complimentary meals in any of its flights. It does sell full in-flight meals on some flights. SpiceJet operates its frequent-flyer programme but does not provide any in-flight entertainment options.

Partnerships 
SpiceJet has partnered with Tripfactory and EaseMyTrip for selling holiday packages on its platform.

SpiceXpress 
SpiceXpress is the air cargo division of SpiceJet. The cargo airline was launched in September 2018 and commenced services on the Delhi-Bengaluru-Delhi route with a Boeing 737-700.

SpiceXpress began services between Guwahati and Hong Kong on 19 January 2019 becoming the first airline to operate freight services between Northeast India and Southeast Asia.
SpiceXpress took delivery of its first 737-800 Boeing Converted Freighter (BCF) in September 2019, becoming the first South Asian carrier to induct the converted freighter into its fleet.

Spice Shuttle
Spice Shuttle is a fully owned subsidiary of SpiceJet which operates sea planes and several other shuttle airplane services.

References

External links

 Official website

Companies based in Gurgaon
Low-cost carriers
Airlines of India
Airlines established in 2005
Indian brands
2005 establishments in Haryana
Indian companies established in 2005
Companies listed on the National Stock Exchange of India
Companies listed on the Bombay Stock Exchange